The following is a list of the largest metropolitan areas in Alabama.  As of 2020  Birmingham has the biggest metropolitan area in Alabama followed by Huntsville. The table data is from the Us Census in 2010 and 2020.

See also
List of metropolitan statistical areas
List of combined statistical areas

References

 
Alabama